The 56th annual Venice International Film Festival was held between 1 and 11 September 1999. The Golden Lion was awarded to Yi ge dou bu neng shao directed by Zhang Yimou.

Jury
The following people comprised the 1999 jury:
 Emir Kusturica (FR Yugoslavia) (head of jury)
 Marco Bellocchio (Italy)
 Maggie Cheung (Hong Kong)
 Jonathan Coe (UK) (critic)
 Jean Douchet (France) (critic)
 Shôzô Ichiyama (Japan)
 Arturo Ripstein (Mexico)
 Cindy Sherman (USA)
 Erick Zonca (France) (short films) (head of jury)
 Hilke Doering (festival curator) (short films)
 Andrea Occhipinti (Italy) (short films)

Official selection

In competition

Autonomous sections

Venice International Film Critics' Week
The following feature films were selected to be screened as In Competition for this section:
 A Texas Funeral by William Blake Herron (United States, United Kingdom)
 Franck Spadone by Richard Bean (France)
 Getting To Know You by Lisanne Skyler (United States)
 Karvaan (en. Shadows In The Dark) by Pankaj Butalia (India)
 Crane World (Mundo grúa) by Pablo Trapero (Argentina)
 Questo è il giardino (en. This Is the Garden) by Giovanni Davide Maderna (Italy)
 Sennen-Tabito by Jinsei Tsuji (Japan)

Awards
 Golden Lion:
 Yi ge dou bu neng shao (Zhang Yimou)
Grand Special Jury Prize:
Bad ma ra khahad bord (Abbas Kiarostami)
Silver Lion:
Seventeen Years (Zhang Yuan)
Volpi Cup:
Best Actor: Jim Broadbent Topsy-Turvy
Best Actress: Nathalie Baye Une liaison pornographique
Special Mention: Heng Tang Se-tong
The President of the Italian Senate's gold medal:
Empty Days (Marion Vernoux)
Marcello Mastroianni Award:
Nordrand (Nina Proll)
Luigi De Laurentiis Award:
Questo è il giardino (Giovanni Maderna)
Special Mention: Bye Bye Africa (Mahamat Saleh Haroun)
Career Golden Lion:
Jerry Lewis
FIPRESCI Prize:
Competition: Bad ma ra khahad bord (Abbas Kiarostami)
Parallel Sections: Being John Malkovich (Spike Jonze)
OCIC Award:
Jesus' Son (Alison Maclean)
Special Award: Tydzien z zycia mezczyzny (Jerzy Stuhr)
Special Award: Guo nian hui jia (Zhang Yuan)
UNICEF Award:
Yi ge dou bu neng shao (Zhang Yimou)
UNESCO Award:
Zion, Auto-Emancipation (Amos Gitai)
Civilisées (Randa Chahal Sabag)
Pasinetti Award:
Best Film: Maurizio Zaccaro (Un uomo perbene)
Best Actor: (Sergi López i Ayats) Une liaison pornographique
Best Actress: (Valeria Bruni Tedeschi) Empty Days
Special Mention: Guo nian hui jia (Zhang Yuan)
Pietro Bianchi Award:
Dino De Laurentiis
Isvema Award:
Questo è il giardino (Giovanni Maderna)
FEDIC Award:
Il dolce rumore della vita (Giuseppe Bertolucci)
Special Award: The Protagonists (Carlo Croccolo)
Special Mention: The Protagonists (Luca Guadagnino)
Special Mention: Típota (Fabrizio Bentivoglio)
Special Mention: Enzo, domani a Palermo! (Daniele Ciprì and Franco Maresco)
Little Golden Lion:
Jesus' Son (Alison Maclean)
Anicaflash Prize:
Crane World (Pablo Trapero)
Elvira Notari Prize:
Holy Smoke! (Kate Winslet and Jane Campion)
Cult Network Italia Prize:
Crane World (Pablo Trapero)
FilmCritica "Bastone Bianco" Award:
Eyes Wide Shut (Stanley Kubrick)
Future Film Festival Digital Award:
Hakuchi: The Innocent (Macoto Tezuka)
Special Mention: Being John Malkovich (Spike Jonze)
Laterna Magica Prize:
Yi ge dou bu neng shao (Zhang Yimou)
Sergio Trasatti Award:
Yi ge dou bu neng shao (Zhang Yimou)
CinemAvvenire Award:
Best Film on the Relationship Man-Nature: After the Rain (Takashi Koizumi)
Best Film: Bad ma ra khahad bord (Abbas Kiarostami)
Best First Film: Bye Bye Africa (Mahamat Saleh Haroun)
Cinema for Peace Award: Closed Door (Atef Hetata)
Children and Cinema Award:
Guo nian hui jia (Zhang Yuan)
Children and Cinema Award - Special Mention:
Ritratti: Mario Rigoni Stern (Carlo Mazzacurati)
Rota Soundtrack Award:
But Forever in My Mind (Paolo Buonvino)
Special Director's Award:
Zhang Yuan

References

External links 

Venice Film Festival 1999 Awards on IMDb

Venice
V
Venice Film Festival
Venice
September 1999 events in Europe
Film